The Nissen Award (Nissen Emery Award) is the award given to the best male collegiate gymnast in the United States.  The award reflects admirable scholarship and moral characteristics as well as sporting success.

List of winners

See also
 AAI Award

References

College sports trophies and awards in the United States
Gymnastics in the United States